Plzeň-City District is a district in the Plzeň Region of the Czech Republic. Its capital is the city of Plzeň.

Administrative division
Plzeň-City District is formed by only one administrative district of municipality with extended competence: Plzeň.

List of municipalities
Cities and towns are marked in bold:

Dýšina -
Chrást -
Chválenice -
Kyšice -
Letkov -
Lhůta -
Losiná -
Mokrouše -
Nezbavětice -
Nezvěstice -
Plzeň -
Starý Plzenec -
Šťáhlavy -
Štěnovický Borek -
Tymákov

Geography

The terrain goes from slightly undulating in the west to hilly in the east. The territory extends into two geomorphological mesoregions: Švihov Highlands (southeast) and Plasy Uplands (northwest).

Four significant rivers flow into the district: Mže, Radbuza, Úhlava and Úslava. Their confluence in Plzeň forms the Berounka River, which flows along the district border further to the northeast. The largest body of water is České údolí Reservoir, built on the Radbuza.

There are no large-scale protected areas.

Demographics

Most populated municipalities

Economy
Plzeň is the economic centre of the entire South Bohemian Region. Almost all the largest employers with its headquarters in Plzeň-City District and at least 500 employers have their seat in Plzeň, the only exception is KS-Europe in Šťáhlavy. The largest of these companies with at least 1,000 employers are:

Transport
The D5 motorway (part of the European route E50) from Prague to Plzeň and the Czech-German border passes through the district.

Sights

The most important monuments in the district, protected as national cultural monuments, are:
Hůrka gord in Starý Plzenec
Cathedral of St. Bartholomew in Plzeň
Kozel Castle
Rural homestead in Plzeň-Bolevec

The best-preserved settlements, protected as monument reservations and monument zones, are:

Plzeň (monument reservation)
Plzeň-Božkov (monument reservation)
Plzeň-Černice (monument reservation)
Plzeň-Koterov (monument reservation)
Dýšina
Kyšice
Plzeň-Bezovka
Plzeň-Bolevec
Plzeň-Bukovec
Plzeň-Červený Hrádek
Plzeň-Křimice
Plzeň-Lobzy
Plzeň-Lochotín
Plzeň-Radčice
Plzeň-Újezd
Tymákov

The most visited tourist destinations are the Plzeň Zoo, DinoPark Plzeň, tower of the Cathedral of St. Bartholomew in Plzeň, and Radyně Castle.

References

External links

Plzeň-City District profile on the Czech Statistical Office's website

 
Districts of the Czech Republic